Morè is a Maratha clan and Mourya clan from the present day Indian state of Maharashtra. Clan members also use it as the surname. Members of the Marathas as well as Mouryan Morè clan use the clan name as their surname. The totem associated with this clan is a peacock. Members worshipping the same Totem cannot intermarry.

History of the Morès of Javli
The Maratha Morè clan of Javli came to prominence  early in the 16th century when the first sultan of Bijapur granted them the fiefdom (Jagir)
of Javli.The ruler of the fief had a title of Chandrarao. Javli, near the modern day hill station of Mahabaleshwar, occupied a strategic position in the eastern foothills of the Northern Sahyadri mountain range. Within 60 miles length of the mountains there are eight passes  through which trade  flowed from the coastal Konkan ports of Chiplun and Colaba  on their way to the inlands of Deccan.For eight generations, the Morès amassed great fortune by taxing the  trade with a help of  a force of 12,000 soldiers.

Conquest of Javli by Shivaji 
Modern historian Dipesh Chakrabarty writes about the controversial circumstances in which Javali was obtained by Shivaji, the founder of Maratha empire in 1656. Javli was very important to Shivaji for the founding of his Kingdom. Upon review of the documents, prominent historian Sarkar concluded that "the acquisition of Javli was the result of deliberate murder and organized treachery on part of Shivaji". However, Chakrabarty says that this conclusion did not sit well with the nationalist historians from Maharashtra of Sarkar's time. This was despite the fact that all the old Hindu biographers agreed that it was an act of premeditated murder. The remaining son of Chandra rao continued his fight against Shivaji by seeking refuge with the Adil shah. Other members of the clan joined the Mughals and  helped the Mughal general, Jai Singh in his campaign against Shivaji.
Historian Gordon agrees with Sarkar and concludes based on historical documents that Shivaji had no legal rights to Javali hence this was an act of "conscious treachery" on his part. and Indian historian Satish Chandra also comes to the same conclusion.

References

Surnames
Maratha clans